The 1876–77 Scottish Cup – officially the Scottish Football Association Challenge Cup – was the fourth season of Scotland's most prestigious football knockout competition. Entries to the competition again increased with a total of 81 clubs involved in the first round draw. This resulted in an earlier start to the competition than in previous seasons with the first matches played on 23 September 1876. The cup was won for the first time by Dunbartonshire club Vale of Leven who defeated Rangers 3–2 in a twice-replayed final.

This was the first final which did not involve defending champions Queen's Park who lost 2–1 to Vale of Leven in the quarter-finals and the first time the cup was won by a team from outside Glasgow.

Calendar

2 teams qualified for the second round after drawing their first round replays
23rd Renfrew RV resigned after winning their first round match
2 teams qualified for the fourth round after drawing their third round replays

Teams
All 81 teams entered the competition in the first round.

First round
Kilmarnock received a bye to the second round.

Matches

Ayrshire district

Glasgow and suburbs

Renfrewshire district

Lanarkshire district

Dunbartonshire district

Edinburgh and East

Replays

Ayrshire district

Glasgow and suburbs

Renfrewshire district

Dunbartonshire district

Second Replay

Glasgow and suburbs

Notes

Sources:

Second round
Busby received a bye to the third round.

Matches

Glasgow district

Dunbartonshire district

Edinburgh district

Lanarkshire district

Renfrewshire district

Ayrshire district

Replays

Glasgow district

Sources:

Third round
Rangers received a bye to the fourth round.

Matches

Replay

Notes

Sources:

Fourth round

Matches

Notes

Sources:

Quarter-finals

Matches

Replay

Sources:

Semi-final
Rangers received a bye to the final.

Match

Sources:

Final

Replay

Second replay

See also
1876–77 in Scottish football

References

1876-77
Cup
Scot